Elections for members of the New York City Council were held in 2013. Primary elections were held on September 10, 2013, for all 51 districts of the city council. Many incumbents are termed out of office, while others were defeated in the primary, resulting in the largest turnover of council members since 2001, when 36 new members were nominated and elected to office in the council. Those who won their primaries without another contending party in the same district are considered the effective winner of the seat outright.

Incumbents not seeking reelection

Term-limited incumbents
17 incumbent councilors (16 Democrats and 1 Republican) were prevented from seeking a 4th consecutive term by term limits.
Christine Quinn (D), District 3
Gale Brewer (D), District 6
Robert Jackson (D), District 7
Oliver Koppell (D), District 11
Joel Rivera (D), District 15
Helen Foster (D), District 16
Peter Vallone Jr. (D), District 22
James F. Gennaro (D), District 24
Leroy Comrie (D), District 27
Diana Reyna (D), District 34
Albert Vann (D), District 36
Erik Martin Dilan (D), District 37
Charles Barron (D), District 42
Lewis A. Fidler (D), District 46
Domenic Recchia (D), District 47
Michael Chaim Nelson (D), District 48
James Oddo (R), District 50

Retiring incumbents
Jessica Lappin (D), District 5
Dan Halloran (R), District 19
Letitia James (WFP), District 35

Incumbents defeated

In primary election
One incumbent Democrat was defeated in the September primary election.
Sara M. Gonzalez (D), District 38

Results

Manhattan

District 1 
Democratic primary

General election

District 2
Democratic primary

General election

District 3
Democratic primary

General election

District 4
Incumbent Democrat Daniel Garodnick was unopposed in the Democratic primary.

District 5
Democratic primary

General election

District 6
Democratic primary

General election

District 7
Democratic primary

General election

District 9
Democratic primary

General election

District 10
Democratic primary

General election

Manhattan/Bronx crossover

District 8
Democratic primary

General election

The Bronx

District 11
Democratic primary

General election

District 12
Democratic primary

General election

District 13
Incumbent Democrat James Vacca was unopposed in the Democratic primary.

District 14
Democratic primary

General election

District 15
Democratic primary

General election

District 16
Democratic primary

General election

District 17
Democratic primary

General election

District 18
Democratic primary

General election

Bronx/Queens crossover

District 22
Democratic primary

General election

Queens

District 19
Democratic primary

General election

District 20
Incumbent Democrat Peter Koo was unopposed in the Democratic primary.

District 21
Incumbent Democrat Julissa Ferreras was unopposed in the Democratic primary

District 23
Incumbent Democrat Mark Weprin was unopposed in the Democratic primary

District 24
Democratic primary

General election

District 25
Incumbent Democrat Daniel Dromm was unopposed in the Democratic primary

District 26
Incumbent Democrat Jimmy Van Bramer was unopposed in the Democratic primary

District 27
Democratic primary

General election

District 28
Democratic primary

General election

District 29
Incumbent Democrat Karen Koslowitz was unopposed in the Democratic primary.

District 30
Incumbent Democrat Elizabeth Crowley was unopposed in the Democratic primary.

District 31
Democratic primary

General election

District 32
Incumbent Republican Eric Ulrich was unopposed in the Republican primary.
Democratic primary

General election

Queens/Brooklyn crossover

District 34
Democratic primary

Working Families primary

General election

Brooklyn

District 33
Democratic primary

General election

District 35
Democratic primary

General election

District 36
Democratic primary

General election

District 37
Democratic primary

General election

District 38

Democratic primary
Endorsements

Results

General election

District 39
Incumbent Democrat Brad Lander was unopposed in the Democratic primary.

District 40
Democratic primary

General election

District 41
Democratic primary

General election

District 42
Democratic primary

General election

District 43
Incumbent Democrat Vincent J. Gentile was unopposed in the Democratic primary.

District 44
Democratic primary

General election

District 45
Democratic primary

General election

District 46
Democratic primary

General election

District 47
Democratic primary

General election

District 48
Democratic primary

General election

Staten Island

District 49
Incumbent Democrat Debi Rose was unopposed in the Democratic primary.

District 50
Republican primary

Democratic primary

General election

District 51
Incumbent Republican Vincent M. Ignizio was unopposed in the Republican primary.

References

New York City Council elections
2013 New York (state) elections
2013 in New York City